Mount Speyer is a mountain, 2,430 m, standing directly at the head of Kehle Glacier in the Worcester Range. Discovered by the Discovery expedition (1901–04) and named for Edgar Speyer, a contributor to the expedition.

Mountains of the Ross Dependency
Hillary Coast